Kangzhuang railway station  is a station of Jingbao Railway in Beijing.

See also
List of stations on Jingbao railway

Railway stations in Beijing